The Naval Historical Branch  originally known as the Historical Section  is the branch responsible for managing the Royal Navy's historical archives, it was established in 1912 and exists today. It is currently superintended by the Head of Naval Historical Branch and Naval Historical Library he reports to the Assistant-Chief of the Naval Staff (Policy).

History
Prior to 1912 responsibility for the management of historical materials was the responsibility of the Admiralty Library later called the Naval Historical Library, its collection transferred to the Naval Historical Branch when it was implemented by First Lord of the Admiralty, Winston Churchill during the period he established the Admiralty War Staff before the First World War. He requested the War Staff include a historical section, explaining it should, “…be the means of sifting, developing and applying the results of history and experience, and of preserving them as a general stock of reasoned opinion available as an aid and guide for all who are called upon to determine, in peace or war, the naval policy of the country,”

This is still relevant today because the Naval Historical Branch (NHB) continues to function as part of the First Sea Lord’s Naval Staff, providing advice and support to defence policy and operations and fulfilling a wide range of tasks for both the Government and the public.

Development of the Branch

The Historical Section was temporarily established before the First World War, but war was declared before it could be properly set up. Information was collected during the war and also after it had finished, the Historical Section combined and organized materials. It also produced hundreds of classified studies and began a comprehensive history of the maritime war. Budget cuts meant this work was never completed, with negative consequences, but the work achieved despite this was more important, underwriting such measures as the immediate introduction of
convoys in 1939. At the outbreak of war the Branch's limited staff were assigned purely to collection. However, the first serious German threat to Britain proved to be mines laid in the sea off the coasts. The Vice Chief of the Naval Staff required historical analysis to effectively counter this. When presented with a mass of raw data and on one to interpret it, he immediately had the Branch reconstituted as both a collection and analytical organization.

During the war, the NHB produced hundreds of reports, including immediate Battle Summaries, which allowed rapid improvements in the Royal Navy's effectiveness. After the war, these were developed into authoritative histories which incorporated captured German materials and are used
extensively with the defence community. They were a basis for the Official Histories and many subsequent works, and NHB is currently publishing them to make them more widely available.

Naval Historical Branch Today

The Branch continues to provide information and advice across defence in order to improve policy decisions. It does so by supplying a historical perspective and by countering any misconceptions that may have arisen without evidence. Recent work includes papers concerning the debate on effects based warfare and the maritime contribution to dealing with terrorists. This work is complemented by the longer-term analysis of new classified staff histories. Histories in progress include an innovative Four-Nation study of maritime co-operation since the 1990-1991 Gulf War, initiated by the chiefs of Naval Staff in Britain, the United States, Canada and Australia. The Branch also works with the fleet headquarters providing war diarist support and historically based training for naval and joint units. Recent examples include the naval war diaries for Operation Telic and a study of the Normandy landings for the Royal Navy's Fleet Battle Staff. The Naval Historical Branch works in partnership with Fleet Headquarters in order to ensure records of the Royal Navy's wide range of activities are produced, preserved and organized, so that their content is permanently accessible. This is vital for the Branch's main business but is also central to legal and compensation issues. These are an increasing aspect of the Branch's work and have considerable financial implications. While the Branch does not ‘judge’ any cases, it does provide a vital expert input, which both assists the early resolution of legitimate claims and helps challenge any which may be more doubtful. As the First Sea Lord, Admiral Sir Alan West, put it: ‘To those who are sceptical about the cost of this historical input, the loss of just one legal case because of lack of written documents would pay for the Branch…

Heads of Naval Historical Branch and Naval Historical Library
Incomplete list:

 Rear-Admiral Peter Noel Buckley: CB. DSO.(retd), 1968-1975

References

Attribution
This article contains text from this source https://www.gov.uk/government/Chronology of the historical branches of the 3 services, which is available under the  Open Government Licence v3.0. © Crown copyright.

Sources
United Kingdom Government, Ministry of Defence, Army Secretariat, Army Headquarters (2012), "A chronology of the historical branches of the 3 services" Naval Historical Branch,  pp. 2–3, //www.gov.uk/government/uploads/system/uploads/attachment_data/file/389352/20141216-FOI07994_Historical_Branches_ArmySec_Redacted.pdf.

 

Admiralty departments
History of the Royal Navy
1912 establishments in the United Kingdom